Przemysław Płacheta (born 23 March 1998) is a Polish professional footballer who plays as a left winger for  club Norwich City and the Poland national team.

Płacheta graduated from RB Leipzig's youth academy and began his senior career in Germany with Sonnenhof Großaspach before returning to Poland where he played for Pogoń Siedlce, Podbeskidzie and Śląsk Wrocław. In 2020, he joined English club Norwich City, and spent time on loan at Birmingham City in 2022. In international football, Płacheta represented Poland at under-age levels before making his debut for the senior national side in 2020.

Club career
Płacheta started his youth career for Polish side Pelikan Łowicz. He joined ŁKS Łódź after his father saw an advert in a newspaper for young footballers. Later, he played for RB Leipzig Academy in Germany, during which time he played for the senior side in a number of friendly matches. In 2017, Płacheta made his professional debut for German 3. Liga team Sonnenhof Großaspach. He later returned to Poland as his mother was ill. He then played for Pogoń Siedlce.

Prior to the 2018–19 I liga, Płacheta signed for Podbeskidzie Bielsko-Biała, and made 25 appearances for the club that season. In 2019, Płacheta signed for Śląsk Wrocław for around 300,000 Polish złoty. He signed a three-year contract with the club. In the 2019–20 I liga, he scored eight goals in 35 appearances, and provided five assists.

In July 2020, Płacheta signed for English club Norwich City, on a four-year deal. The deal was estimated to be around €3 million (around 12 million złoty), a club record sale for Śląsk Wrocław. Płacheta was Norwich's first ever Polish player. He scored his first goal for Norwich in a 2–2 draw against Preston North End on 19 September 2020.

Płacheta joined EFL Championship club Birmingham City in July 2022 on loan for the season. He scored his first goal on his second appearance, at home to Huddersfield Town on 5 August, when he drove the rebound from Jordan James's blocked shot past the goalkeeper to give his side a 2–0 half-time lead; the match ended 2–1. After starting the first five matches of the season, used in an unfamiliar left wing-back position, he suffered a stress fracture to his left tibia and did not play again. His loan was terminated on 3 January 2023 and he returned to Norwich to continue his recovery.

International career
Płacheta played for Poland under-21s in a 2019 UEFA European Under-21 Championship match against Spain under-21s in Italy. He was the youngest player in Czesław Michniewicz's Poland under-21 squad. In November 2020, Płacheta made his first appearance for the Poland senior team in a friendly match against Ukraine.

Personal life
Płacheta was born on 23 March 1998 in Łowicz, Poland. When Płacheta was young, he was a bobsledder, before choosing to become a footballer. Płacheta has said that he is a fan of Chelsea footballer Raheem Sterling, and has compared his playing style to Sterling. His older brother Marcin is a former runner and bobsledder who competed at the 2006 Winter Olympics. Their mother died in 2019.

Career statistics

Club

International

Honours

Norwich City
EFL Championship: 2020–21

References

External links
 
 
 

1998 births
Living people
People from Łowicz
Polish footballers
Poland youth international footballers
Poland under-21 international footballers
Poland international footballers
Association football wingers
SG Sonnenhof Großaspach players
MKP Pogoń Siedlce players
Podbeskidzie Bielsko-Biała players
Śląsk Wrocław players
Norwich City F.C. players
Birmingham City F.C. players
3. Liga players
I liga players
Ekstraklasa players
English Football League players
UEFA Euro 2020 players
Polish expatriate footballers
Polish expatriate sportspeople in Germany
Polish expatriate sportspeople in England
Expatriate footballers in Germany
Expatriate footballers in England